Nyctegretis lineana is a moth of the family Pyralidae. It is found from Europe to China and Mongolia.

The butterflies are on wing from July to August depending on the location.

The larvae feed on Ononis repens repens, Ononis repens spinosa and sometimes Trifolium.

References

External links
Microplepidoptera.nl 
UKMoths

Moths described in 1786
Phycitini
Moths of Japan
Moths of Europe
Moths of Asia